Paatusoq, mentioned as 'Patursok' by Wilhelm August Graah, is a fjord in the King Frederick VI Coast, Kujalleq municipality, southeastern Greenland. Its name means "The one with the big mouth" in the Greenlandic language.

Geography
There are two rocks awash in its mouth and Qasingortoq, a  point marks its entrance. Danell Fjord lies close to the north, running parallel to Paatusoq. 

Mountains
This mountain is marked as a  peak in the Defense Mapping Agency Greenland Navigation charts.

See also
List of fjords of Greenland
List of Ultras of Greenland

Bibliography
The Lost Gardar Intrusion: Critical Metal Exploration at the Paatusoq Syenite Complex, South East Greenland

References

External links
Den grønlandske Lods - Geodatastyrelsen
The Magmatic and Fluid Evolution of the Motzfeldt Intrusion in South Greenland: Insights into the Formation of Agpaitic and Miaskitic Rocks
 Ketilidian structure and the rapakivi suite between Lindenow Fjord and Kap Farvel, South-East Greenland
The Ketilidian orogen of South Greenland: geochronology, tectonics, magmatism, and fore-arc accretion during Palaeoproterozoic oblique convergence
Photographs just in from Paatusoq site 22 September 2014
Fjords of Greenland